Coastal (foaled April 6, 1976 at Claiborne Farm in Kentucky) was an American Thoroughbred racehorse best known for winning the 1979 Belmont Stakes.

Background
He was sired by U.S. Racing Hall of Fame inductee Majestic Prince out of the mare Alluvial, who was in turn was sired by U.S. Racing Hall of Fame stallion Buckpasser. He was a half-brother, through Alluvial, to Slew o' Gold. He was owned by William Haggin Perry and trained by David A. Whiteley.

Racing career
In 1979, the three-year-old Coastal did not run in the Kentucky Derby and Preakness Stakes having made his first start in April as a result of a serious eye injury which had cut short his racing at age two. Prior to entering the mile and one-half Belmont Stakes, Coastal had raced only three times that year. He won all three under Ruben Hernandez, but at distances of six then seven furlongs followed by the Peter Pan Stakes at a mile and one-eighth. Without another race at least at a mile and an eighth or more, his owner eventually decided to pay the supplemental nomination fee and run the colt in the Belmont Stakes. Coastal and Hernandez then won the Belmont in a huge upset over Spectacular Bid, who placed third, becoming the first supplemental entry to ever win the race.

Coastal next won the Dwyer Stakes on July 7, 1979 and the Haskell Invitational Handicap on August 4. He would finish second to Affirmed in the Woodward Stakes and third in the Marlboro Cup Invitational Handicap behind Spectacular Bid and General Assembly. Then, in the Grade I Jockey Club Gold Cup, in a stretch battle with rivals Spectacular Bid and Affirmed, he again placed third, with Affirmed winning the race.

Retirement
Coastal was retired to stud at Claiborne Farm in Kentuck. In 1988, he was sent to Mick Goss' Summerhill Stud in South Africa. He sired graded stakes winners Cherry Jubilee, Dangers Hour, Little Brianne, and Canadian multiple stakes winner Triple Wow.

Pensioned in the spring of 2003, Coastal died on September 29, 2005.

Pedigree

References

External links
 Pedigree and partial statistics
 Video at YouTube of Coastal winning the 1979 Belmont Stakes

1976 racehorse births
2005 racehorse deaths
Racehorses bred in Kentucky
Racehorses trained in the United States
Belmont Stakes winners
Thoroughbred family 9-f